Robert Rushbrooke (1779–1845) was a British Conservative Party politician.

He was elected to the House of Commons as one of the two Members of Parliament (MPs) for the Western division of Suffolk at the 1835 general election. Rushbrooke held the seat until his death in 1845, aged 65.

References

External links 
 

1779 births
1845 deaths
Conservative Party (UK) MPs for English constituencies
UK MPs 1835–1837
UK MPs 1837–1841
UK MPs 1841–1847